Don Bosco Technical High School may refer to:

 Don Bosco Technical High School (Boston)
 Don Bosco Technical High School (East Timor)

 Don Bosco Technical High School (Paterson, NJ)